Francis Litsingi (born 10 September 1986) is a former Congolese football striker. He played mostly in the Czech Republic and Hungary.

Club career
Listingi started out at Brazzaville club Saint Michel d'Ouenzé where at the age of 19 he enjoyed a very successful season scoring 20 goals in the league and becoming the league's top goalscorer for the 2005/06 season. His success at Saint Michel provoked interest from Cameroon Première Division teams with Cotonsport winning the battle for his services in the 2006/07 season, Litsingi proved to be a great talent scoring 15 goals in the league becoming top goalscorer and numerous goals in the CAF Champions League.

In June 2007 Litsingi trialled with Swiss Super League side Neuchâtel Xamax. He also attracted interest from Hungarian League side Diósgyőri VTK. In August 2007 Litsingi trialled with Iranian giants Persepolis F.C. and were close to inking a one-year deal but the deal fell through.
In 2008, he signed with Újpest FC (3 years contract) in the Hungarian First Division, but Litsingi had loaned to Kecskeméti TE. On 18 January 2013 he signed a 3-year contract with Czech first league team FK Teplice.

Gaziantep BB
On 6 January 2016 it was confirmed that Listingi had signed a 1.5-year contract with Gaziantep BB in Turkey.

References

1986 births
Living people
Sportspeople from Brazzaville
Republic of the Congo footballers
Association football forwards
Republic of the Congo international footballers
Saint Michel d'Ouenzé players
Coton Sport FC de Garoua players
Nemzeti Bajnokság I players
Újpest FC players
Kecskeméti TE players
FK Teplice players
Czech First League players
Republic of the Congo expatriate footballers
Expatriate footballers in Cameroon
Expatriate footballers in Hungary
Expatriate footballers in the Czech Republic
Republic of the Congo expatriate sportspeople in Cameroon
Republic of the Congo expatriate sportspeople in Hungary
2015 Africa Cup of Nations players
FC Zbrojovka Brno players
AC Sparta Prague players
TFF First League players
Gaziantep F.K. footballers
Expatriate footballers in Turkey
Elite One players
Republic of the Congo expatriate sportspeople in the Czech Republic